St Francis of Assisi Church, dedicated to St Francis of Assisi, in Valletta (the capital city of Malta), was built in 1598 and was completed by 1607.

History 
After a few decades, however, the church developed structural defects and in 1681 it was built anew through the "munificence" of Grand Master Gregorio Carafa, whose coat of arms adorns the façade.

The church was enlarged in the 1920s following plans by Emanuel Borg, which also included a dome. This implied the removal of some of the frescos by Giuseppe Calì, which were replaced with others by Gianni Vella.

However the church still hosts precious works of art including paintings by Mattia Preti, Pietro Gagliardi and Filippo Paladini, as well as the titular statue of St Francis.

The church building is listed on the National Inventory of the Cultural Property of the Maltese Islands.

See also 

 Culture of Malta
 History of Malta
 List of Churches in Malta
 Religion in Malta

References 

1598 establishments in Europe
Buildings and structures in Valletta
Roman Catholic churches completed in 1607
17th-century Roman Catholic church buildings in Malta
National Inventory of the Cultural Property of the Maltese Islands
1607 establishments in Malta
16th-century establishments in Malta
Church buildings with domes